Claude Vivier (1948–1983) was a Canadian composer of contemporary classical music.

Other uses

People

Other notable people with the surname Vivier include:

Basie Vivier (1927–2009), South African rugby union footballer
Eugène Léon Vivier (1821–1900), French horn player
Jacques Vivier (b. 1930), French professional cyclist
Robert Vivier (1894–1989), Belgian poet and writer
Roger Vivier (1907–1998), French fashion designer who specialized in shoes

Places
Vivier-au-Court, a commune in the Ardennes department in northern France
Le Vivier-sur-Mer, a commune in the Ille-et-Vilaine department of Brittany in northern France
Épanchoir du Vivier, a siphon for water release from the Canal du Midi in France

See also
Viviers (disambiguation)